Stephen DiBrienza (born December 9, 1954) is an American politician who served in the New York City Council from 1986 to 2001.

References

1954 births
Living people
New York City Council members
New York (state) Democrats